The Neptune is a ship replica of a 17th-century Spanish galleon designed by Naval Architect David Cannell of www.dmcmarine.com. The ship was built in 1985 for Roman Polanski's film Pirates, where she portrayed the Spanish ship of the same name. An accurate replica above the waterline, but sporting a partly steel hull, planked in timber and two main engines with Schottel drive, the Neptune is currently a tourist attraction in the port of Genoa, where its interior can be visited for a 9 euro entry fee. In 2011, she portrayed the Jolly Roger, the ship of Captain Hook, in the TV miniseries Neverland.

Gallery

References

Replica ships
Tourist attractions in Genoa
1986 ships
Tall ships